This article lists events in 2013 in South Sudan.

Incumbents 

 President: Salva Kiir Mayardit
 Vice President: Riek Machar (until 23 July), vacant (from 23 July until 25 August), James Wani Igga (from 25 August)

Events 

 15 December – President Kiir accuses his former deputy Riek Machar and ten others of attempting a coup d'état, leading to the start of the South Sudanese Civil War.

Deaths

References 

 
2010s in South Sudan
Years of the 21st century in South Sudan
South Sudan
South Sudan